Von Hernandez is a leading environmental activist from the Philippines. He was Executive Director of Greenpeace Southeast Asia (GPSEA) from 2008 to 2014, where he led the environmental group's programs and operations in the Southeast Asian region. Prior to that, he served as Campaigns Director for the organization, and was responsible for driving the group's campaigns in Thailand, Indonesia and the Philippines on a number of issues including climate change, forests, sustainable agriculture and toxics pollution. Currently, he serves as Development Director for Greenpeace International.

History
An environmental activist for more than 20 years, Von initiated and led a number of  campaigns in the Philippines including  the approval of landmark laws like the Ecological Waste Management Act and the  Clean Air Act. He also spearheaded campaigns to rehabilitate the Pasig River as well as efforts to clean up toxic sites in former US military bases in the country. He founded and spearheaded various environmental coalitions at the national and international levels including the Global Alliance for Incinerator Alternatives (GAIA), Waste Not Asia, Lakbay Kalikasan, the Ecowaste coalition, and the Sagip Pasig Movement.

Von Hernandez is a former literature professor and well-known environmental activist from the Philippines. He has spoken up against the processing of imported garbage, when waste incinerators pump out clouds of dioxin and other harmful chemicals. The Philippines was the first nation in the world to ban waste incineration nationwide, in 1999. Hernandez now works with Greenpeace Southeast Asia, serving as its executive director.

Education
Von Hernandez graduated from the University of the Philippines, with a bachelor's degree in English. He recently completed his Master in Public Management (MPM) degree from the National University of Singapore. The MPM is a prestigious program designed for senior managers by the Lee Kuan Yew School of Public Policy, and which includes spending a full semester at the Harvard Kennedy School of Government.

Awards
 2003 Goldman Environmental Prize. 
 
In 2003, Von was awarded the Goldman Environmental Prize for his work which led to the first national ban on waste incineration.  The Goldman Prize is considered to be the equivalent of the Nobel Prize for grassroots environmental activists.  Being the first Prize recipient from the Philippines, Asia Inc. magazine named him as one of Asia's young movers and shakers in 2004. In 2007, he was also included in  Time magazine's Heroes of the Environment, joining other innovative and influential protectors of the environment like Al Gore and Nobel Peace Prize laureate Wangari Maathai. More recently, Von was listed among the top 20 most trusted Filipinos by Reader's Digest in its nationwide Trust Poll in 2010.

 Time magazine's list of "Heroes of the Environment" October 2007.

References

Filipino academics
Filipino environmentalists
Year of birth missing (living people)
Living people
People associated with Greenpeace
University of the Philippines alumni
National University of Singapore alumni
Goldman Environmental Prize awardees